Quri Gol is a village in Vargahan Rural District, in the Central District of Ahar County, East Azerbaijan Province, Iran. At the 2006 census, its population was 26, in 8 families.

References 

Populated places in Ahar County